Podosinovsky District is an administrative and municipal district (raion), one of the thirty-nine in Kirov Oblast, Russia. It is located in the northwest of the oblast. Its administrative center is the urban locality (an urban-type settlement) of Podosinovets. Population:  21,649 (2002 Census);  The population of Podosinovets accounts for 23.7% of the district's total population.

References

Notes

Sources

Districts of Kirov Oblast